Ernest Glover (19 February 1891 – 13 April 1954) was a British athlete who competed in the 5,000 metres, the 10,000 metres, and in cross country at the 1912 Summer Olympics held in Stockholm, Sweden. Glover's 16th place in the individual cross country event helped him to earn a bronze medal with teammates Frederick Hibbins and Thomas Humphreys in the team competition. Although he qualified for the 5,000 m and 10,000 m finals, he withdrew from both.

At the 1913 English Cross Country Union championships in Wolverhampton, Glover earned the national title in cross country. That same year, he won the 10 mile event at the Amateur Athletic Association Championships in London in a time of 51:56.8.

At the International Cross Country Championships, Glover finished second to Jean Bouin in 1913, then third to Alfred Nichols and George Wallach in 1914.

Notes

References

External links

Profile at www.olympics.org.uk

1891 births
1954 deaths
English male long-distance runners
Sportspeople from Sheffield
Olympic bronze medallists for Great Britain
Athletes (track and field) at the 1912 Summer Olympics
Olympic athletes of Great Britain
Medalists at the 1912 Summer Olympics
Olympic bronze medalists in athletics (track and field)
Olympic cross country runners